Tanigawa (written: 谷川) is a Japanese surname. Notable people with the surname include:

, Japanese idol and singer
, Japanese ten-pin bowler 
Hideki Tanigawa (born 1977), Japanese sumo wrestler and coach
, Japanese shogi player
, Japanese writer
, Japanese hurdler
, Japanese politician 
, Japanese politician

See also
Tanikawa

Japanese-language surnames